Tijana Filipović (born 26 May 1999) is a Serbian footballer who plays as a midfielder and has appeared for the Serbia women's national team.

Career
Filipović has been capped for the Serbia national team, appearing for the team during the 2019 FIFA Women's World Cup qualifying cycle.

International goals

References

External links
 
 
 

1999 births
Living people
Serbian women's footballers
Serbia women's international footballers
Women's association football midfielders
ŽFK Spartak Subotica players
People from Ruma